Bob Patterson may refer to:
 Bob Patterson (TV series), American television sitcom
 Bob Patterson (baseball) (born 1959), American baseball player
 Bob Patterson (basketball) (1932–2018), American basketball player 
 Robert H. Patterson Jr. (1927–2012), American attorney

See also
Bobby Patterson (disambiguation)
Robert Patterson (disambiguation)

Patterson, Bob